Wheels is a 1998 Yugoslav black comedy film directed by Đorđe Milosavljević.

Cast 
 Dragan Mićanović - Nemanja
 Anica Dobra - Zana
 Ljubiša Samardžić - Vlasnik hotela
 Nikola Kojo - Korenko
 Bogdan Diklić - Coric
 Neda Arnerić - Mrs. Coric
 Svetozar Cvetković - Milan
 Milorad Mandić - Mileta
 Isidora Minić - Irena

External links 

1998 comedy films
1998 films
Serbian comedy films
Films set in Serbia
Films shot in Serbia
1990s Serbian-language films